WPXJ-TV (channel 51) is a television station licensed to Batavia, New York, United States, serving the Buffalo area as an affiliate of Ion Television. Owned by Inyo Broadcast Holdings, the station maintains offices on Exchange Street in Buffalo, and its transmitter is located in Cowlesville, New York.

Until August 2019, WPXJ-TV's transmitter was based at Pavilion, approximately halfway between the station's two target cities, Buffalo and Rochester; it was the only station in Western New York to serve both markets with the same signal (WNYB still serves both markets, but relies on translators and cable carriage to do so), although what little local programming the station has carried has traditionally favored Buffalo, and Ion now maintains a separate Rochester affiliation on the fourth digital subchannel of WHEC-TV.

History
The station signed on the air on June 17, 1999 as an owned-and-operated station of Ion predecessor Pax TV, and was founded by Paxson Communications. WPXJ-TV was Paxson's second effort at launching a television station in Western New York; the first was Jamestown-based WNYP-TV (channel 26), an affiliate of Canadian television network CTV, which Pax founder Lowell W. "Bud" Paxson majority owned from 1966 to 1969. In February 2006, WPXJ-TV was added to Dish Network's Buffalo channel lineup on channel 51.

Near sale to Scripps; sale to Inyo Broadcast Holdings
On September 24, 2020, the Cincinnati-based E. W. Scripps Company announced that it would purchase Ion Media for $2.65 billion, with financing from Berkshire Hathaway. With this purchase, Scripps will divest 23 Ion-owned stations, but no announcement was made as to which stations that Scripps would divest as part of the move. However, on October 16, 2020, it was announced that WPXJ-TV would be one of the stations that Scripps would spin off as part of the merger. The buyer, revealed in an October 2020 FCC filing to be Inyo Broadcast Holdings, has promised to maintain the stations' Ion Television affiliations after the purchase. The proposed divestitures will allow the merged company to fully comply with the FCC local and national ownership regulations. This would have made it a sister station to ABC affiliate WKBW-TV (channel 7) if Scripps had decided to keep WPXJ-TV, but Buffalo has fewer than eight independently owned and operating full-power television stations, not enough to permit a duopoly in any case (even as both Nexstar Media Group and Sinclair Broadcast Group both hold longstanding duopolies in the same market). The transaction was finalized and closed on January 7, 2021.

Newscasts
For a time, WPXJ-TV carried a rebroadcast of newscasts from NBC affiliate WGRZ (channel 2), as well as a live 10:00 p.m. newscast produced by that station (this was part of a nationwide initiative for Pax affiliates to carry news and local content from NBC stations). Channel 2 News First at Ten was the first primetime newscast in the Buffalo market (as previously noted, virtually none of the newscast's content was geared toward Rochester, despite WGRZ having a large sister news bureau in that city). It was never a ratings contender and consistently lost the ratings battle with WNLO (channel 23)'s newscast in the same time slot, which had debuted a few weeks later but had been planned for months.

After Pax ended its local news partnerships with NBC in 2005, WGRZ later established a news share agreement with WNYO-TV (channel 49) to produce a half-hour 10:00 p.m. newscast for that station in April 2006, which effectively replaced WNYO-TV's in-house newscast that was canceled the month before in relation to the shutdown of owner Sinclair Broadcast Group's News Central division; that newscast was moved to Fox affiliate WUTV (channel 29) on April 8, 2013.

Technical information

Subchannels
The station's digital signal is multiplexed:

Analog-to-digital conversion
WPXJ-TV discontinued regular programming on its analog signal, over UHF channel 51, on June 12, 2009, the official date in which full-power television stations in the United States transitioned from analog to digital broadcasts under federal mandate. The station's digital signal moved from its pre-transition UHF channel 53, which was among the high band UHF channels (52–69) that were removed from broadcasting use as a result of the transition, to UHF channel 23 (formerly allocated to the analog signal of CW affiliate WNLO, which continues to use channel 23 as its virtual channel). Through the use of PSIP, digital television receivers display the station's virtual channel as its former UHF analog channel 51.

References

External links
Ion Television website

Ion Television affiliates
Court TV affiliates
Grit (TV network) affiliates
Laff (TV network) affiliates
Defy TV affiliates
TrueReal affiliates
Scripps News affiliates
Television channels and stations established in 1999
1999 establishments in New York (state)
PXJ-TV
Genesee County, New York